Robert McKinlay (10 October 1932 – 27 August 2002) was a Scottish professional footballer who played as a centre half. He made 614 league appearances for Nottingham Forest, including a run of 265 consecutive games (all in the top division of English football) between 1959 and 1965, before joining the club's coaching staff. He is the club's record appearance holder and won the FA Cup with the club in 1959. He later worked as a prison officer.

His uncle Billy McKinlay also played for Nottingham Forest.

Career statistics

A.  The "Other" column constitutes appearances in the FA Charity Shield and Inter-Cities Fairs Cup.

Honours
Nottingham Forest
 FA Cup: 1958–59

See also
 List of footballers in England by number of league appearances (500+)
 List of one-club men in association football

References

1932 births
2002 deaths
People from Lochgelly
Scottish footballers
Nottingham Forest F.C. players
English Football League players
Footballers from Fife
Association football central defenders
Nottingham Forest F.C. non-playing staff
FA Cup Final players
Bowhill Rovers F.C. players